Vardan Singh (born 19 May 1983) is an Indian Playback singer and music director.  He first gained popularity for his song Kabhi Yun Bhi from the movie Ishq Junoon.

Early life and education
Vardan Singh was born to a business family in Jaunpur, the district of Uttar Pradesh. He was brought up in Lucknow , Nawabon Ka Shahar. Vardan did his schooling from Lucknow. He is graduated from University of Lucknow. Vardan Singh is trained in classical music from Late Pandit Ganesh Prasad Mishra who is a well known 'A' grade artist in Hindustani Classical music.

Career
Vardan started his career as a background musician. He first sang for Anjaan movie, directed by Hansal Mehta. He got popularity when he sang for Bollywood film Ishq Junoon. The song Kabhi Yun Bhi.  from Ishq Junoon broken many records and got the place in UK top 10 music list.

Filmography

Singing

Background music
Shaadi Se Pehle-2006
Apna Sapna Money Money-2006
Kaafila-2007
Heroes
Main Aurr Mrs Khanna-2009
Yamla Pagla Deewana-2011
Chaar Din Ki Chandni- 2012
All Is Well- 2015

References

External links
 

Living people
Indian male playback singers
Singers from Lucknow
Bollywood playback singers
1983 births